Queen Victoria Street may refer to:
Queen Victoria Street, Fremantle, Western Australia
Queen Victoria Street, Hong Kong
Queen Victoria Street, London
Queen Victoria Street, Reading, Berkshire

See also 
 List of places named after Queen Victoria
 Victoria Avenue (disambiguation)
 Victoria Street (disambiguation)